Dandenikumbura is a village in Sri Lanka. It is located within Central Province.Now in present only one man is living in this village. His name is 
Maharagedara Heenbanda he is a village Physician (වෙද මහතෙක්).

See also
List of towns in Central Province, Sri Lanka

External links

Populated places in Matale District